Birte Christoffersen (later Hanson, then Ekberg; born 28 March 1924) is a Danish retired diver. She competed in the 3 m springboard and 10 m platform for Denmark at the 1948 Summer Olympics and for Sweden at the 1956 and 1960 Summer Olympics. She won a bronze medal in the platform in 1948 and finished in 8–12th place on other occasions.

At the European championships Christoffersen won bronze medals in both the platform and springboard in 1950, competing for Denmark. In 1953 she moved to Sweden, and next year won silver medals in both events. She earned one more bronze medal in 1958, in the platform.

References

1924 births
Living people
Danish female divers
Swedish female divers
Olympic divers of Denmark
Olympic divers of Sweden
Divers at the 1948 Summer Olympics
Divers at the 1956 Summer Olympics
Divers at the 1960 Summer Olympics
Olympic bronze medalists for Denmark
Olympic medalists in diving
Medalists at the 1948 Summer Olympics
Malmö SS divers
Stockholms KK divers
Divers from Copenhagen